Lochside Park is a cricket ground in Forfar, Scotland.  The first recorded match held on the ground came in 1984 when Scotland B played Durham University.  The ground held its first List A match when Scotland played Lancashire in the 1991 Benson & Hedges Cup.  Five further List A matches were played there, all involving Scotland in the Benson & Hedges Cup.  The last match of that type to be held there came in the 1998 Benson & Hedges Cup when Derbyshire were the visitors.

The ground is still in use today by Strathmore County Cricket Club.

Records

List A
 Highest team total: 235 for 6 (55 overs) by Northamptonshire v Scotland, 1992
 Lowest team total: 106 for 8 (55 overs) by Scotland v Essex, 1993
 Highest individual innings: 103 by Alan Fordham for Northamptonshire v Scotland, 1992
 Best bowling in an innings: 5 for 21 by Mark Ilott for Essex v Scotland, 1993

References

External links
Lochside Park at ESPNcricinfo
Lochside Park at CricketArchive

Cricket grounds in Scotland
Sports venues in Angus, Scotland
Forfar